Marcello Gandini (born 26 August 1938) is an Italian car designer, known for his work with the automotive design house Gruppo Bertone, including his designs of the Lamborghini Miura, Countach, and the Lamborghini Diablo.

In a 2009 interview with Robert Cumberford, editor at Automobile Magazine, Gandini indicated, "his design interests are focused on vehicle architecture, construction, assembly, and mechanisms – not appearance."

Life and career
The son of an orchestral conductor, Gandini, was born in Turin.

In 1963, he approached Nuccio Bertone, head of the Gruppo Bertone company, for work. However, Giorgetto Giugiaro, then Bertone's chief designer, opposed him being hired. When Giugiaro left Bertone two years later, Gandini was hired, and worked for the company for fourteen years.

Creator of Stile Bertone in Caprie, Gandini served as general manager of the styling house, designing show cars as well as managing the construction of prototype automobiles.

Gandini designed Lamborghini's groundbreaking mid-engined Miura and extreme Countach in 1973, as well as many practical cars such as the Citroën BX, the first-generation BMW 5 Series (E12), the Innocenti Mini, and the Renault Supercinq.  He introduced the concept of scissor doors with the Alfa Romeo 33 Carabo prototype, while the Lancia Stratos sports car was another Gandini design.

Gandini left Bertone in 1980, pursuing freelance automotive, industrial, and interior design.

Gandini has worked in other areas, including home architecture, the design of a nightclub interior, and the body styling of the Heli-Sport CH-7 helicopter.

Designs
Gandini car designs include:

Alfa Romeo Montreal concept and production version
Alfa Romeo 33 Carabo
Alfa Romeo Navajo
Autobianchi A112
Autobianchi A112 Runabout
Bertone Pirana
Bugatti EB 110 (prototypes)
BMW 5 Series (E12), including the concept Garmisch in 1970
Citroën BX
Citroën GS Camargue
Cizeta-Moroder V16T
De Tomaso Biguà (Qvale Mangusta)
De Tomaso Pantera SI
De Tomaso Pantera 'Prossima Generazione'
Dino/Ferrari 308 GT4
Ferrari Rainbow
Fiat 132
Fiat X1/9
Iso Lele
Iso Grifo 90
Iso Grifo 96
Jaguar Ascot
Lamborghini Bravo
Lamborghini Countach
Lamborghini P140
Lamborghini Diablo (prototypes) 
Lamborghini P147 Acosta
Lamborghini Espada
Lamborghini Jarama
Lamborghini Miura
Lamborghini Urraco
Lamborghini Marzal
Lancia Stratos Zero
Lancia Stratos
Lancia Sibilo
Maserati Khamsin
Maserati Ghibli II
Maserati Quattroporte II (1974–1978) & IV (1994–2001)
Maserati Shamal
Maserati Chubasco
1st and 2nd Maserati Biturbos facelift
Nissan AP-X
NSU Trapeze
Perodua Kancil (facelift)
Renault 5 Turbo
Renault 5 Supercinq 
Renault Magnum
TaMo Racemo
Stola S81 Stratos
Stola S86 Diamante
Volvo Tundra

Gallery

References

External links

Fiat X1/9 web site
 BMW Designers  Marcello Gandini on the page with an overview of automotive designers working for BMW.
 Marcello Gandini: Maestro of Design by Gautam Sen.  A complete two volume set featuring the designs and biography of Marcello Gandini.

1938 births
Living people
Automotive engineers from Turin
Gruppo Bertone
Lamborghini people
BMW designers
Alfa Romeo people
Maserati people
Lancia